The women's 1500 metres at the 2007 Asian Winter Games was held on 31 January 2007 in Changchun, China.

Schedule
All times are China Standard Time (UTC+08:00)

Records

Results
Legend
DSQ — Disqualified

References
Results
Results

External links
Official website

Women 1500